Flummerfelt is a surname. Notable people with the surname include: 

Charles H. Flummerfelt (1863–1931), American politician
Joseph Flummerfelt (1937–2019), American conductor